KGiSL Institute of Technology (KiTE) is a private engineering college started in 2008 by G. Bakthavathsalam, Founder-Chairman of KG Hospital. It is located at Saravanampatti in Coimbatore, Tamil Nadu, India. The college is affiliated to Anna University. It offers various undergraduate and postgraduate courses leading to the Degree of Bachelor of Engineering (B.E).

References

External links 

 

Engineering colleges in Coimbatore
Colleges affiliated to Anna University
2008 establishments in Tamil Nadu
Educational institutions established in 2008